Eleanor Anna "Elly" Baker (born April 1977) is a British Labour Party politician who has been a Member of the London Assembly (AM) for Londonwide since 2021. She was an organiser for the National Education Union.

Early life 
Baker grew up in East London and educated in Hackney.

London Assembly 
For Baker's selection as a Labour candidate to the London Assembly, she was endorsed by Sam Tarry, GMB, Fire Brigades Union, BFAWU, ASLEF, Communication Workers Union and Unite the Union.

References 

Living people
21st-century British women politicians
Labour Members of the London Assembly
Women councillors in England
1977 births

Trade unionists from London